Strathalbyn is the name of two places in Australia.
 Strathalbyn, South Australia
 Strathalbyn, Western Australia, a suburb of Geraldton